Sandégué is a town in eastern Ivory Coast. It is a sub-prefecture of and the seat of Sandégué Department in Gontougo Region, Zanzan District. Sandégué is also a commune.

In 2014, the population of the sub-prefecture of Sandégué was 23,068.

Villages
The fourteen villages of the sub-prefecture of Sandégué and their population in 2014 are:
 Sandégué (2 972)
 Bandakagni-Sokoura (3 531)
 Daridougou (2 784)
 Gbangbo (944)
 Kamelé (2 005)
 Kassoumdougou (331)
 Kiéti (869)
 Kouakoukankro (1 549)
 Logondé (371)
 Madam (1 432)
 Pala (1 651)
 Sanguéhi (1 605)
 Talahini-Sokoura (371)
 Talahini-Tomora (2 653)

Notes

Sub-prefectures of Gontougo
Communes of Gontougo